Varem may refer to:
Jeff Varem, Nigerian basketball player
Zarem, a village in Iran